Wilfred "Tim" McCoy (4 March 1921 – 27 January 2005) was an English professional footballer who made 184 Football League appearances playing as a centre half for Portsmouth, Northampton Town and Brighton & Hove Albion.

Life and career
McCoy was born in Birmingham in 1921. He was nicknamed Tim, after the Western film star Tim McCoy, and was generally known by that name. His football career appeared to have ended prematurely when the outbreak of the Second World War and a call-up to the Army prevented him from taking up a trial with Bolton Wanderers. However, when he was posted to Preston Barracks in Brighton, he appeared in wartime matches for Brighton & Hove Albion in the 1940–41 season.

After the war, he signed for First Division club Portsmouth. As backup to Reg Flewin, he made just 18 league appearances in two-and-a-half seasons, and moved on to Northampton Town. He captained the team, and helped them finish as Third Division South runners-up in 1949–50. In January 1951, he returned to Brighton & Hove Albion where he was a regular in the team for nearly three years. He left at the end of the 1933–34 season, and went on to play non-league football for Tonbridge, Dover and as player-coach of East Grinstead.

He then worked as a representative of an electrical appliances company and lived in the Woodingdean area of Brighton. He died in the city in 2005 at the age of 83.

References

1921 births
2005 deaths
Footballers from Birmingham, West Midlands
English footballers
Association football defenders
Brighton & Hove Albion F.C. players
Portsmouth F.C. players
Tonbridge Angels F.C. players
Northampton Town F.C. players
Dover F.C. players
East Grinstead Town F.C. players
English Football League players
Southern Football League players
British Army personnel of World War II